Park Jae-woo (born 6 March 1998) is a South Korean footballer currently playing as a right-back for Gimpo FC.

Career statistics

Club

Notes

References

1998 births
Living people
People from Jinju
Sungkyunkwan University alumni
South Korean footballers
Association football defenders
K League 1 players
K League 2 players
Pohang Steelers players